Oleg Kuleshov (born 20 August 1976) is a Belarusian freestyle skier. He competed in the men's moguls event at the 1998 Winter Olympics.

References

1976 births
Living people
Belarusian male freestyle skiers
Olympic freestyle skiers of Belarus
Freestyle skiers at the 1998 Winter Olympics
Sportspeople from Minsk